Austin Anthony Vetter (born September 13, 1967) is an American prelate of the Roman Catholic Church who has been serving as bishop of the Diocese of Helena in Montana since 2019.

Biography

Early life 
Austin Vetter was born on September 13, 1967, in Linton, North Dakota. After attending North Dakota State University in Fargo, North Dakota, from 1985 to 1989, he studied for the priesthood at Cardinal Muench Seminary in Fargo  from 1986 to 1989.  Vetter then attended the Pontifical North American College in Rome, earning a Bachelor of Sacred Theology degree from the Pontifical University of St. Thomas Aquinas in 1992.

Priesthood 
On June 29, 1993, Vetter was ordained to the priesthood for the Diocese of Bismarck at the Cathedral of the Holy Spirit in Bismarck, North Dakota, by Bishop John Kinney. After his ordination, Vetter's pastoral assignments in North Dakota parishes included:

 Parochial vicar at Cathedral of the Holy Spirit
 Pastor of St. Martin’s in Center
 Pastor of St. Patrick’s in Dickinson 
 Pastor at St. Leo the Great in Minot
While completing his pastoral assignments, Vetter also served as a religion instructor at St. Mary's Central High School in Bismarck (1994-1999).  He later became an adjunct faculty member at the Institute for Priestly Formation at Creighton University in Omaha, Nebraska. (2004-2007).

In 2012, Vetter returned to Rome to serve as director of spiritual formation at the Pontifical North American College, a post he would hold for six years.  After returning to Bismarck in 2018, he was named rector of Cathedral of the Holy Spirit.

Bishop of Helena
Pope Francis appointed Vetter as the eleventh bishop of the Diocese of Helena on October 8, 2019. Vetter was consecrated by Archbishop Alexander Sample on November 20, 2019.

See also

 Catholic Church hierarchy
 Catholic Church in the United States
 Historical list of the Catholic bishops of the United States
 List of Catholic bishops of the United States
 Lists of patriarchs, archbishops, and bishops

References

External links

1967 births
Living people
People from Emmons County, North Dakota
North Dakota State University alumni
Pontifical University of Saint Thomas Aquinas alumni
Roman Catholic Diocese of Bismarck
Roman Catholic bishops of Helena
21st-century Roman Catholic bishops in the United States
Bishops appointed by Pope Francis
Roman Catholic Diocese of Helena